Bryan J. Breitling is an American politician serving as a member of the South Dakota Senate from the 23rd district. Elected in November 2020, he assumed office on January 12, 2021.

Early life and education 
Breitling was born in Hoven, South Dakota and graduated from Roscoe High School. He served in the Army National Guard for 11 years before earning a Bachelor of Science degree in business from Northern State University and a Master of Healthcare Administration from the University of Sioux Falls.

Career 
Prior to entering politics, Breitling worked as a healthcare administrator at nursing homes and hospitals around South Dakota. He was elected to the South Dakota Senate in November 2020 and assumed office on January 12, 2021. He is the vice chair of the Senate Appropriations Committee.

In April 2021, Breitling became the chair of a newly established legislative committee to study implementation of recreational and medical marijuana programs in the state.

References 

Living people
People from Potter County, South Dakota
Northern State University alumni
University of Sioux Falls alumni
Republican Party South Dakota state senators
Year of birth missing (living people)